Alexis Raúl Danelón  (born 6 January 1986 in Capitán Bermúdez) is an Argentine football defender who last played for Central Córdoba SdE.

Danelón made his professional debut on November 9, 2007 in a 4–1 home defeat to Lanús, and scored his first goal in professional football in a 4–2 win over Tigre on May 30, 2008. He scored again versus Estudiantes de La Plata on August 9, 2008

External links
Alexis Danelón – Argentine Primera statistics at Fútbol XXI 

1986 births
Living people
People from San Lorenzo Department
Argentine footballers
Association football defenders
Rosario Central footballers
Boca Unidos footballers
Sportspeople from Santa Fe Province